Kevin Fox may refer to:

 Kevin Fox (footballer) (1917–1993), Australian rules football player
 Kevin Fox (designer), user interface designer